BH Pošta is one of three companies responsible for postal service in Bosnia and Herzegovina. The other two are Pošte Srpske and Hrvatska pošta Mostar. BH Pošta operates mainly in Bosniak-majority areas in the Federation of Bosnia and Herzegovina.

BH Pošta is the largest postal operator in Bosnia and Herzegovina with a wide network of post offices consisting of 386 units with 822 active counters in total, providing a full spectrum of domestic and international postal services.

References

External links

Communications in Bosnia and Herzegovina
Companies based in Sarajevo
Bosnia and Herzegovina
Philately of Bosnia and Herzegovina
Government-owned companies of Bosnia and Herzegovina